Brian Thomas Bogusevic (Serbian Latin: Brian Bogušević; born February 18, 1984) is an American professional baseball former outfielder and broadcaster. He played in Major League Baseball (MLB) for the Houston Astros, Chicago Cubs, and Philadelphia Phillies and in Nippon Professional Baseball (NPB) for the Orix Buffaloes.

College career
Bogusevic was a two-way star player for Tulane University, playing in the outfield and also used as a starting pitcher. He was also a two-way player in high school, a three-year letterman at Chicago's De La Salle Institute for coach Brad Esposito pitching and playing outfield. In 2004, he played collegiate summer baseball with the Falmouth Commodores of the Cape Cod Baseball League. While playing for the Green Wave, he was named to the All-Tournament Team in the 2005 Conference USA Tournament.

Professional career

Houston Astros
He was drafted 24th overall in the 2005 MLB Draft by the Houston Astros as a starting pitcher. He remained a pitcher in the Houston Astros organization until mid- before converting to an outfielder. In 2008, he was selected to play in the Arizona Fall League as an outfielder.

On August 16, 2011, he became the 26th player in MLB History to hit an "ultimate grand slam," a pinch-hit walk-off home run which won the game by one run.

Bogusevic reprised his old pitching role for one game in 2012, a June 7 relief appearance against the St. Louis Cardinals. Entering a 12–2 blowout, Bogusevic pitched the 9th inning and surrendered two runs. He featured a 90 mph fastball.

On November 3, Bogusevic elected to become a free agent after being outrighted off the 40-man roster.

Chicago Cubs
On November 21, 2012, Bogusevic signed a minor league deal with the Chicago Cubs. He was allocated to the minors on March 22, 2013, in spite of hitting .410 in spring training. The fifth outfielder was Dave Sappelt, who won the job because of his platooning ability. He was the Iowa Cubs Opening Day first baseman and went 3–5 with an RBI and a run in his debut. Through April, he was hitting .420 with 10 RBI and 16 runs. Through May he was hitting .367 with 5 HR, 20 RBI and 32 runs. On June 25, Bogusevic was called up by Chicago. At the time, Bogusevic was hitting .319 with 10 HR, 32 RBI and 50 runs in 78 games with Iowa. He made his Chicago debut on June 26, going 2–4 with a walk. When Ryan Sweeney went on the disabled list with fracture ribs, Bogusevic took over in center field. However, on July 14, Bogusevic suffered an injury of his own, and was replaced by Junior Lake. After rehabbing in Arizona, Bogusevic returned on August 19, replacing the recently traded David DeJesus. Bogusevic was splitting time with Darnell McDonald in left field with Lake in center field, but when Sweeney returned on September 1, he pushed Lake to left field, and Lake and Bogusevic split time there. In 47 games with Chicago, Bogusevic hit .273 with 6 HR, 16 RBI and 18 runs.

Miami Marlins
On December 12, 2013, the Cubs traded Bogusevic to the Miami Marlins for outfielder Justin Ruggiano. He was designated for assignment on March 30, 2014. Bogusevic elected free agency in October 2014.

Philadelphia Phillies
On November 1, 2014, Bogusevic signed a minor-league contract with the Philadelphia Phillies. He split between the 2015 season between the AAA Lehigh Valley IronPigs and the Phillies. Bogusevic hit .296 with 12 HR and 57 RBI for Lehigh Valley in 118 games, and .259 with 2 HR and 5 RBI for Philadelphia in 22 games. After being outrighted off the Phillies' 40-man roster, he became a free agent in October 2015.

Orix Buffaloes
Bogusevic signed with the Orix Buffaloes of Nippon Professional Baseball for the 2016 season. He appeared in 60 games for the Buffaloes in 2016, and hit .187 with three home runs and 18 RBI.

Boston Red Sox
On January 7, 2017, Bogusevic returned to the MLB by signing a minor league contract with the Boston Red Sox that included an invitation to spring training. Bogusevic hit .278/.331/.467 with 12 home runs and 40 RBI for the Pawtucket Red Sox, the Red Sox Triple A team. Bogusevic did not appear in a big league game in 2017. He elected free agency on November 6, 2017.

Post-playing career 
On April 14, 2019, he was a substitute postgame anchor for the Astros.

References

External links

Brian Bogusevic at Astros Daily
 Brian Bogusevic Milb.com Page
 Brian Bogusevic Tulane Player Page

1984 births
Living people
Águilas Cibaeñas players
American expatriate baseball players in the Dominican Republic
American expatriate baseball players in Japan
American people of Serbian descent
Arizona League Cubs players
Baseball pitchers
Baseball players at the 2015 Pan American Games
Baseball players from Chicago
Chicago Cubs players
Corpus Christi Hooks players
De La Salle Institute alumni
Falmouth Commodores players
Gulf Coast Marlins players
Houston Astros players
Indios de Mayagüez players
Iowa Cubs players
Lehigh Valley IronPigs players
Lexington Legends players
Major League Baseball outfielders
New Orleans Zephyrs players
Nippon Professional Baseball outfielders
Oklahoma City RedHawks players
Orix Buffaloes players
Pan American Games medalists in baseball
Pan American Games silver medalists for the United States
Pawtucket Red Sox players
People from Oak Lawn, Illinois
People from Palos Heights, Illinois
Philadelphia Phillies players
Round Rock Express players
Salem Avalanche players
Scottsdale Scorpions players
Toros del Este players
Tri-City ValleyCats players
Tulane Green Wave baseball players
United States national baseball team players
Medalists at the 2015 Pan American Games